The Repealing and Amending Act, 2017 is an Act of the Parliament of India that repealed 104 Acts, and also partially repealed three sections of the Taxation Laws (Amendment) Act, 2007, and made minor amendments to three other Acts to correct typographical errors. The Act was the fourth such repealing act tabled by the Narendra Modi administration aimed at repealing obsolete laws.

Background and legislative history
Prime Minister Narendra Modi advocated the repeal of old laws during his 2014 general election campaign. At the 2015 Economic Times Global Business Summit, Modi stated, "Our country suffers from an excess of old and unnecessary laws which obstruct people and businesses. We began the exercise of identifying unnecessary laws and repealing them. 1,877 Central laws have been identified for repeal."

The Repealing and Amending Bill, 2017  was introduced in the Lok Sabha on 9 February 2017 by the Minister of Law and Justice, Ravi Shankar Prasad. The bill sought to repeal 104 Acts, including over 20 Acts enacted before independence. It also sought to repeal three sections of the Taxation Laws (Amendment) Act, 2007, and make minor amendments to three other Acts to correct typographical errors.

The bill was passed by the Lok Sabha on 19 December 2017 and by the Rajya Sabha on 28 December 2017. The bill received assent from President Ram Nath Kovind on 5 January 2018, and was notified in The Gazette of India on 8 January 2018.

Repealed Acts
The 104 Acts included in the bill's First Schedule were completely repealed.

See also
 List of legislations repealed under Modi government

References

Law of India
Acts of the Parliament of India
Modi administration
2018 in law
2018 in India
Repealed Indian legislation